In Greek mythology, Platanus is the daughter of the Thessalian king Aloeus and the sister of the Aloadae giants, who attacked the gods. Platanus was said to be as big as her brothers. Her brief tale survives in the chronicles of a Byzantine scholar of the twelfth century, Nicephorus Basilacius.

Family 
Platanus was the daughter of Aloeus, the stepfather of the Aloadae, presumably by his wife Iphimedeia, the Aloadae's mother. She also had a sister named Elate.

Mythology 
Platanus was a very beautiful girl, and as great in stature as her enormous brothers and sister. When Zeus with a lightning bolt slew the Aloadae for trying to wage war against the very heavens, Platanus was so sorrowful her shape change to that of a tree bearing her name, the plane tree, keeping the great size and beauty she had in her previous life. A similar fate befell her sister Elate, who transformed into a fir tree for the same reason.

See also 

 Cyparissus
 Heliades
 Niobe

References

Bibliography 
 
  
 

Women in Greek mythology
Greek legendary creatures
Greek giants
Metamorphoses into trees in Greek mythology
Family of Canace
Thessalian characters in Greek mythology